The Popovka is a river in Yakutia and Magadan regions, a left tributary of the Kolyma.

See also
List of rivers of Russia

References

Rivers of Magadan Oblast
Rivers of the Sakha Republic